David Hallberg (born May 18, 1982) is an American classical ballet dancer. He was a principal dancer with American Ballet Theatre and resident guest artist at The Australian Ballet, as well as a principal dancer with the Bolshoi Ballet. In 2021, Hallberg became the artistic director of The Australian Ballet.

Early life
Hallberg was born in Rapid City, South Dakota, and grew up in Phoenix, Arizona. He was inspired to dance when he saw a Fred Astaire film in the family living room. With his family's support, he trained at the Ballet Arizona School under the direction of Kee Juan Han. In 1999 he studied for one year at the Paris Opera Ballet School, then joined American Ballet Theatre's Studio Company in 2001.

Career
Hallberg joined American Ballet Theatre's (ABT) corps de ballet in 2001, was promoted to soloist in 2004, then principal in 2006. He has been a guest artist with many different companies around the world, including the Mariinsky Ballet, the Paris Opera Ballet, Royal Swedish Ballet, The Australian Ballet, Kyiv Ballet in  Ukraine, Ballet Estable del Teatro Colón in Buenos Aires and many others. He has also performed at galas around the world from Japan to the Bolshoi Ballet in Moscow. In 2010, Hallberg won the Prix Benois de la Danse for his portrayal of Count Albrecht in Giselle.

In 2011 Hallberg became the first American to become a principal dancer with the Bolshoi Ballet. Hallberg was invited by Sergei Filin, Bolshoi Ballet's artistic director to join as either a guest artist or principal. Part of his decision to join was made, in part, to dance with ballerina Natalia Osipova with whom he had danced previously. However, owing to a severe ankle injury, he did not perform with the Bolshoi after July 2014, and the association ended formally in 2017.

During two years off stage due to complications recovering from surgery on his left foot, Hallberg spent 15 months working with The Australian Ballet's physiotherapy and rehabilitation team, building a relationship with the company that resulted in his being named Resident Guest Artist. He finally returned to the stage in a role début, that of Franz in Coppélia, with The Australian Ballet and partnered with Amber Scott in December 2016.

Hallberg starred in the 2017 Nike campaign, "I, David", directed by Niclas Gillis with set design by James Casebere.

Hallberg published a memoir, A Body of Work: Dancing to the Edge and Back, with the Touchstone imprint of Simon & Schuster in November 2017.

Hallberg established the David Hallberg Scholarship to mentor aspiring male dancers at American Ballet Theatre's Studio Company and Ballet Arizona. Hallberg has directed ABT Incubator, a two-week choreographic program at Ballet Theater, since 2018.

In March 2020 Hallberg was announced as the new artistic director of The Australian Ballet, succeeding David McAllister. He took up the position in January 2021. Hallberg's final tour as a dancer was cancelled due to the coronavirus pandemic. He is set to have a "a proper farewell performance" during ABT's 2021 Metropolitan Opera House season.

Selected repertoire

The Boy in Afternoon of a Faun
The title role in Apollo
Solor in La Bayadère
The Prince in Frederick Ashton's Cinderella
Her Prince Charming in James Kudelka's Cinderella
Conrad in Le Corsaire
Basilio and Espada in Don Quixote
Oberon in The Dream
Albrecht in Giselle
Pierrot in Harlequinade
Des Grieux in Lady of the Camellias
Des Grieux in Manon
Beliaev in A Month in the Country
The Cavalier in Kevin McKenzie's The Nutcracker
The title role in Onegin
Other Dances
Bernard and Jean de Brienne in Raymonda
Romeo, Paris and Benvolio in Romeo and Juliet
Prince Désiré in The Sleeping Beauty
Prince Siegfried, von Rothbart (Act III) and Benno in Swan Lake
James in La Sylphide
Aminta in Sylvia
The first movement in Symphony in C
Tchaikovsky Pas de Deux
Les Sylphides
Symphonic Variations
Theme and Variations
Drink to Me Only With Thine Eyes
Petite Mort

Created roles
Robert Hill's Dorian
Kaschei in Alexei Ratmansky's The Firebird
The Nutcracker Prince in Ratmansky's The Nutcracker
Olga's Fiancé in On the Dnieper
Prince Coffee in Whipped Cream
Chamber Symphony
I Feel the Earth Move
Rabbit and Rogue
Thirteen Diversions
Citizen

Source:

References

External links
 
 David Hallberg at American Ballet Theatre
 
 Archival footage of Hallberg performing in Nacho Duato's Kaburias in 2012 at Jacob's Pillow Dance Festival
 "Less Boyish at the Bolshoi" by Alastair Macaulay, The New York Times, July 18, 2014

1982 births
Living people
American male ballet dancers
21st-century American ballet dancers
American Ballet Theatre principal dancers
Bolshoi Ballet principal dancers
LGBT dancers
Prix Benois de la Danse winners
People from Rapid City, South Dakota
American expatriates in Australia